Chippewa County International Airport  is a public use airport in Chippewa County, Michigan, United States. It is located 15 nautical miles (17 mi, 28 km) south of the central business district of Sault Ste. Marie, Michigan. The airport is owned by the Chippewa County Economic Development Corporation. It was formerly the Kincheloe Air Force Base.

It is included in the Federal Aviation Administration (FAA) National Plan of Integrated Airport Systems for 2017–2021, in which it is categorized as a non-hub primary commercial service facility.

The airport received $1.1 million in 2020 as part of the federal CARES act to combat the COVID-19 pandemic. The money went towards helping maintain operations and complete upgrades during the pandemic-induced travel downturn.

Facilities and aircraft
It has two runways: 16/34 measures 7,203 by 150 feet (2,195 x 46 m) with a concrete surface and 10/28 is 5,000 by 75 feet (1,524 x 23 m) with an asphalt surface.

The airport opened a new passenger terminal in September 2002. The airport is used mostly for general aviation but is served by one commercial airline.  UNICOM is utilized as a common traffic advisory frequency (CTAF) on 123.00 MHz, since the original USAF air traffic control tower is unmanned and non-operational.  Runway 16/34 has a displaced threshold and was originally  in length in order to accommodate B-52 and KC-135 aircraft when the airport was an operational Strategic Air Command base.  However,  of the runway has not been maintained and is no longer suitable for takeoffs or landings.

The airport has an FBO offering AvGas and JetA fuel. Catering, a courtesy car, a conference room, a crew lounge, and other amenities are all available. The facility was upgraded from 2020 to 2022, when it was reopened to the public. $5.5 million were contributed from a federal grant.

For the 12-month period ending August 31, 2019, the airport had 3,457 aircraft operations, an average of 9 per day: 41% scheduled commercial, 34% air taxi, 23% general aviation and 2% military. In September 2020, there were 14 aircraft based at this airport: 8 single-engine, 5 multi-engine and 1 jet.

Airline and destinations

Passenger

Statistics

References

Other sources

 Essential Air Service documents (Docket DOT-OST-2009-0160) from the U.S. Department of Transportation:
 Ninety-day notice (July 14, 2009): from Mesaba Aviation, Inc. of its intent to discontinue unsubsidized scheduled air service at the following communities, effective October 12, 2009: Paducah, KY; Alpena, MI; Muskegon, MI; Hancock, MI; Sault Ste. Marie, MI; International Falls, MN; Tupelo, MS and Eau Claire, WI.
 Essential Air Service documents (Docket DOT-OST-2009-0303) from the U.S. Department of Transportation:
 Memorandum (November 19, 2009): closing out docket DOT-2009-0160 and opening up eight new dockets for the various communities (Alpena, MI; Eau Claire, WI; Hancock/Houghton, MI; International Falls, MN; Muskegon, MI; Paducah, KY; Sault Ste. Marie, MI; Tupelo, MS).
 Order 2010-5-18 (May 13, 2010): setting final past-period subsidy rates for Mesaba Airlines, Inc., d/b/a Delta Connection, for its forced service at Alpena and Sault Ste. Marie, Michigan, International Falls, Minnesota, and Tupelo, Mississippi. Also selecting Mesaba to provide essential air service (EAS) at three of these four communities on a prospective basis. At the fourth community, Tupelo, we are tentatively selecting Mesaba to provide service based on a pro-rata application of the rate Mesaba agreed to which the staff applied to a reduced service level.
 Ninety Day Notice (July 15, 2011): from MESABA AVIATION, INC. and PINNACLE AIRLINES, INC. of termination of service at Sault Ste Marie, MI.
 Order 2011-9-5 (September 13, 2011): prohibiting suspension of service and requesting proposals
 Order 2012-4-10 (April 6, 2012): selecting Delta Air Lines, Inc., to provide essential air service (EAS) at Chisholm/Hibbing, Minnesota, and Escanaba, Pellston, and Sault Ste. Marie, Michigan, for $2,517,770, $2,833,558, $1,055,361, and $1,676,136, respectively. At Pellston, the service is to consist of 12 nonstop round trips per week to Detroit in the off-peak, and 14 per week in the peak period. At Sault Ste. Marie, the service will be 13 round trips per week year round. At the remaining two communities, serviceis to consist of 12 nonstop round trips per week year round. All service is to be operated with 50-seat CRJ-200 aircraft.
 Order 2013-10-8 (October 21, 2013): reselecting Delta Air Lines, Inc., to provide Essential Air Service (EAS) at Pellston and Sault Ste. Marie, Michigan; and SkyWest Airlines, at Paducah, Kentucky; Hancock/Houghton, and Muskegon, Michigan; and Eau Claire, Wisconsin. The Order also tentatively reselects American Airlines, at Watertown, New York. Sault Ste. Marie, Michigan: Docket 2009-0303; Effective Period: February 1, 2014, through January 31, 2016; Service: Thirteen nonstop round trips per week to Detroit (DTW); Aircraft Type: CRJ-200; Annual Subsidy: $1,765,393.

External links
 
 Aerial photo as of April 1998 from USGS The National Map
 
 

Airports in Michigan
Essential Air Service
Buildings and structures in Chippewa County, Michigan
Transportation in Chippewa County, Michigan
Airports in the Upper Peninsula of Michigan